Sai Kung Central is one of the 29 constituencies in the Sai Kung District.

The constituency returns one district councillor to the Sai Kung District Council, with an election every four years.

Sai Kung Central constituency is loosely based on town centre in Sai Kung with estimated population of 10,901 as of 2019.

The boundaries of the constituency are Tai Mong Tsai Road, Hiram's Highway and Po Tung Road on the north and west.

Councillors represented

Election results

2010s

References

External links
 

Constituencies of Hong Kong
Constituencies of Sai Kung District Council
1982 establishments in Hong Kong
Constituencies established in 1982